Skutterskelfe is a civil parish in the Hambleton district of North Yorkshire, England and lies to the north of the River Leven. The population of the parish at the 2011 census was 129.

The parish has a single Grade II* listed building, Rudby Hall, at Hutton Rudby, formerly called Leven Grove, and then Skutterskelfe Hall. The parish has three Grade II listed buildings, all connected to the hall – the pump house, the terrace walls and balustrade, garden wall and gate piers, and the north lodge to the park.

References

Civil parishes in North Yorkshire
Hambleton District